This is an incomplete list of official organizations associated with the United States Democratic Party:

Constituency groups
 College Democrats
 High School Democrats of America
 LGBT Democrats
 National Federation of Democratic Women
 National Jewish Democratic Council
 Stonewall Democrats
 Young Democrats of America
 DNC Women

Ideological
 Center for American Progress
 Blue Collar Caucus
 Blue Dog Coalition
 Democracy for America
 ActBlue
 America Votes
 Democrats for Life of America
 New Democrat Coalition 
 New Democrat Network
 Congressional Progressive Caucus
 Progressive Change Campaign Committee
 Progressive Democrats of America
 Progressive Policy Institute
 EMILY's List
 MoveOn

 America Coming Together
 Democratic Leadership Council

Fundraising and coordination
 Democratic Congressional Campaign Committee
 Democratic Governors Association
 Democratic National Committee
 Democratic Senatorial Campaign Committee
 Democrats Abroad
 National Conference of Democratic Mayors
 Democratic Legislative Campaign Committee
 Democratic Attorneys General Association
 Democratic Association of Secretaries of State
 National Democratic County Officials
 Democratic Municipal Officials
 National Democratic Redistricting Committee

See also
 List of state parties of the Democratic Party (United States)

References